Lucas Alberto Correa Belmonte (born 3 February 1984) is an Argentine footballer who plays as a midfielder for Italian club Castiadas.

He also holds a Spanish passport, to be eligible to get around the non-EU quota imposed in European leagues

Club career
Correa started his career at Rosario Central. In summer 2004 he left for Italian Eccellenza side Penne. He then signed by Serie C1 side Lanciano. In January 2007 S.S. Lazio paid €500,000 to sign the player, which he signed a contract until June 2011. Correa spent  seasons on loan at Lega Pro Prima Divisione clubs. Lazio received €50,000, €50,000 and €100,000 from Gallipoli, Pro Patria and Taranto respectively for the loan deal. He failed to loan out at the start of 2010–11 Serie A until January 2011 left for Varese in 6 months deal on free transfer.

In July 2011 he left for Avellino In January 2012 he was loaned to Bassano. In July 2012 Avellino sold him to Bassano for free.

On 3 August 2013 he was signed by Casertana.

Ahead of the 2019/20 season, Correa returned to Tuttocuoio for the second time. Six months later, in January 2020, he moved to Eccellenza club Castiadas.

International career
Correa played for the Argentina U17 team at the 2001 FIFA U-17 World Championship.

References

External links

1984 births
Living people
Argentine footballers
Argentina youth international footballers
Argentine expatriate footballers
Argentine people of Spanish descent
Citizens of Spain through descent
Expatriate footballers in Italy
Footballers from Rosario, Santa Fe
Argentine emigrants to Spain
Argentine expatriate sportspeople in Italy
Serie B players
Serie C players
Serie D players
Eccellenza players
Rosario Central footballers
S.S. Virtus Lanciano 1924 players
S.S. Lazio players
S.S.D. Lucchese 1905 players
A.S.D. Gallipoli Football 1909 players
Aurora Pro Patria 1919 players
Taranto F.C. 1927 players
Ravenna F.C. players
S.S.D. Varese Calcio players
U.S. Avellino 1912 players
Bassano Virtus 55 S.T. players
Association football midfielders
A.S. Bisceglie Calcio 1913 players
Mantova 1911 players
A.C. Tuttocuoio 1957 San Miniato players